Mrunalini Bhosale is an Indian filmmaker. She made her directorial debut with the critically acclaimed feminist agrarian feature film Kapus Kondyachi Goshta (Unending Story).

Career
Mrunalini Bhosale received training in filmmaking at the Film and Television Institute of India, Pune. She also holds a degree in English Literature. She co-founded the agricultural commerce platform Agro India in 1995, and has organized several international farming seminars and exhibitions across India.

Filmography
Mrunalini has directed and produced 50 documentaries in Marathi, Gujarati, Hindi and English. She received two National Film Awards from the President of India for her film Jaivik Kheti (Organic Farming) - Best Agricultural Film (India) and Best Direction. Her film Kapus Kondyachi Goshta (2014) also garnered several international awards:

 International Indian Film Festival of Queensland in Brisbane 2014 – Best Feature Film
 Sahyadri Cine Awards 2014 - Best Feature Film
 Maharashtra State Film Awards - Best Actress (Samidha Guru)

References

External links
 Official Facebook Page of Kapus Kondyachi Goshta
 Official Twitter Page of Kapus Kondyachi Goshta
Official Website of the movie Kapus Kondyachi Goshta
Official Website of M R Agro Informatics

Indian women film directors
Living people
Year of birth missing (living people)
Indian documentary filmmakers
21st-century Indian film directors
21st-century Indian women artists
Indian women documentary filmmakers